Joseph Shack (December 8, 1915 – May 5, 1987) was a Canadian professional ice hockey left winger who played 70 games in the National Hockey League for the New York Rangers in the 1940s. Shack was born in Winnipeg, Manitoba, but grew up in Montreal, Quebec.

External links

1915 births
1987 deaths
Canadian ice hockey left wingers
Elmwood Maple Leafs players
Elmwood Millionaires players
New York Rangers players
Ice hockey people from Montreal